Cyril Charles Slapnicka (March 23, 1886 – October 20, 1979) was a Major League Baseball pitcher and executive. He played for the Chicago Cubs (1911) and Pittsburgh Pirates (1918). His playing career was unusual in that he went almost seven years between major league appearances. He also played 18 years of minor league ball.

In 10 total games pitched Slapnicka had a record of 1–6 with an ERA of 4.30 in 73.1 innings pitched.  He started eight games, completed five, and finished two.  He also had one save.

His more significant contributions to baseball came when his playing career was over.  He was the General Manager of the Cleveland Indians from 1935 to 1940, and then a major league scout for the Indians until he retired in 1961.  He signed 31 major league players, including Hall of Famers Bob Feller and Bob Lemon. He resigned as Indians Vice President in September 1941.
   
Slapnicka died in his hometown of Cedar Rapids, Iowa, at the age of 93.

References

External links

Retrosheet
The Deadball Era

1886 births
1979 deaths
Baseball executives
Baseball players from Iowa
Birmingham Barons players
Burlington Pathfinders players
Cedar Rapids Rabbits players
Chicago Cubs players
Chicago Cubs scouts
Cleveland Indians executives
Cleveland Indians scouts
Hannibal Cannibals players
Joplin Miners players
Major League Baseball pitchers
Major League Baseball general managers
Marshalltown Brownies players
Marshalltown Snappers players
Milwaukee Brewers (minor league) players
Minor league baseball managers
Newton Railroaders players
Pittsburgh Pirates players
Rockford Reds players
Rockford Wolverines players
St. Louis Browns scouts
Galesburg Boosters players